The 2005 Western Michigan Broncos football team represented Western Michigan University in the 2005 NCAA Division I-A football season.  They competed as members of the Mid-American Conference in the West Division. The team was coached by Bill Cubit and played their homes game in Waldo Stadium in Kalamazoo, Michigan.

The Broncos won the Michigan MAC Trophy and the WMU–CMU Rivalry Trophy.

Schedule

Roster

References

Western Michigan
Western Michigan Broncos football seasons
Western Michigan Broncos football